Henry Gonzalez may refer to:

 Henry B. González (1916–2000), politician from the state of Texas
 Henry C. Gonzalez, city council member in South Gate, California, USA
 Henry Gonzalez Vega (born 1993), Costa Rican gymnast